Asparagales (asparagoid lilies) is an order of flowering plants (anthophytes) in modern classification systems such as the Angiosperm Phylogeny Group (APG) and the Angiosperm Phylogeny Web. The order takes its name from the type family Asparagaceae and is placed in the monocots amongst the lilioid monocots. The order has only recently been recognized in classification systems. It was first put forward by Huber in 1977 and later taken up in the Dahlgren system of 1985 and then the APG in 1998, 2003 and 2009. Before this, many of its families were assigned to the old order Liliales, a very large order containing almost all monocots with colorful tepals and lacking starch in their endosperm. DNA sequence analysis indicated that many of the taxa previously included in Liliales should actually be redistributed over three orders, Liliales, Asparagales, and Dioscoreales. The boundaries of the Asparagales and of its families have undergone a series of changes in recent years; future research may lead to further changes and ultimately greater stability. In the APG circumscription, Asparagales is the largest order of monocots with 14 families, 1,122 genera, and about 36,000 species.

The order is clearly circumscribed on the basis of molecular phylogenetics, but it is difficult to define morphologically since its members are structurally diverse. Most species of Asparagales are herbaceous perennials, although some are climbers and some are tree-like. The order also contains many geophytes (bulbs, corms, and various kinds of tuber). According to telomere sequence, at least two evolutionary switch-points happened within the order. One of the defining characteristics (synapomorphies) of the order is the presence of phytomelanin, a black pigment present in the seed coat, creating a dark crust. Phytomelanin is found in most families of the Asparagales (although not in Orchidaceae, thought to be the sister-group of the rest of the order). The leaves of almost all species form a tight rosette, either at the base of the plant or at the end of the stem, but occasionally along the stem. The flowers are not particularly distinctive, being 'lily type', with six tepals and up to six stamina. The order is thought to have first diverged from other related monocots some 120–130 million years ago (early in the Cretaceous period), although given the difficulty in classifying the families involved, estimates are likely to be uncertain.

From an economic point of view, the order Asparagales is second in importance within the monocots to the order Poales (which includes grasses and cereals). Some species are used as food and flavourings.

The anthophytes are a grouping of plant taxa bearing flower-like reproductive structures. They were formerly thought to be a clade comprising plants bearing flower-like structures.  The group contained the angiosperms - the extant flowering plants, such as roses and grasses - as well as the Gnetales and the extinct Bennettitales.

23,420 species of vascular plant have been recorded in South Africa, making it the sixth most species-rich country in the world and the most species-rich country on the African continent. Of these, 153 species are considered to be threatened. Nine biomes have been described in South Africa: Fynbos, Succulent Karoo, desert, Nama Karoo, grassland, savanna, Albany thickets, the Indian Ocean coastal belt, and forests.

The 2018 South African National Biodiversity Institute's National Biodiversity Assessment plant checklist lists 35,130 taxa in the phyla Anthocerotophyta (hornworts (6)), Anthophyta (flowering plants (33534)), Bryophyta (mosses (685)), Cycadophyta (cycads (42)), Lycopodiophyta (Lycophytes(45)), Marchantiophyta (liverworts (376)), Pinophyta (conifers (33)), and Pteridophyta (cryptogams (408)).

14 families are represented in the literature. Listed taxa include species, subspecies, varieties, and forms as recorded, some of which have subsequently been allocated to other taxa as synonyms, in which cases the accepted taxon is appended to the listing. Multiple entries under alternative names reflect taxonomic revision over time.

Agapanthaceae
Family Agapanthaceae,

Agapanthus
Genus Agapanthus:
 Agapanthus africanus (L.) Hoffmanns. endemic
 Agapanthus africanus (L.) Hoffmanns. subsp. africanus, endemic
 Agapanthus africanus (L.) Hoffmanns. subsp. walshii (L.Bolus) Zonn. & G.D.Duncan, accepted as Agapanthus walshii L.Bolus, endemic
 Agapanthus campanulatus F.M.Leight. indigenous
 Agapanthus campanulatus F.M.Leight. subsp. campanulatus, indigenous
 Agapanthus campanulatus F.M.Leight. subsp. patens (F.M.Leight.) F.M.Leight. indigenous
 Agapanthus caulescens Spreng. indigenous
 Agapanthus caulescens Spreng. subsp. angustifolius F.M.Leight. indigenous
 Agapanthus caulescens Spreng. subsp. caulescens, indigenous
 Agapanthus caulescens Spreng. subsp. gracilis (F.M.Leight.) F.M.Leight. endemic
 Agapanthus coddii F.M.Leight. endemic
 Agapanthus comptonii F.M.Leight. accepted as Agapanthus praecox Willd. subsp. minimus (Lindl.) F.M.Leight.	
 Agapanthus comptonii F.M.Leight. subsp. longitubus F.M.Leight. accepted as Agapanthus praecox Willd. subsp. minimus (Lindl.) F.M.Leight. indigenous
 Agapanthus dyeri F.M.Leight. accepted as Agapanthus inapertus P.Beauv. subsp. intermedius F.M.Leight. indigenous
 Agapanthus ensifolius (Thunb.) Willd. accepted as Lachenalia ensifolia (Thunb.) J.C.Manning & Goldblatt, indigenous
 Agapanthus inapertus P.Beauv. indigenous
 Agapanthus inapertus P.Beauv. subsp. hollandii (F.M.Leight.) F.M.Leight. endemic
 Agapanthus inapertus P.Beauv. subsp. inapertus endemic
 Agapanthus inapertus P.Beauv. subsp. intermedius F.M.Leight. indigenous
 Agapanthus inapertus P.Beauv. subsp. parviflorus F.M.Leight. endemic
 Agapanthus inapertus P.Beauv. subsp. pendulus (L.Bolus) F.M.Leight. endemic
 Agapanthus nutans F.M.Leight. accepted as Agapanthus caulescens Spreng. subsp. gracilis (F.M.Leight.) F.M.Leight. indigenous
 Agapanthus praecox Willd. indigenous
 Agapanthus praecox Willd. subsp. minimus (Lindl.) F.M.Leight. endemic
 Agapanthus praecox Willd. subsp. orientalis (F.M.Leight.) F.M.Leight. endemic
 Agapanthus praecox Willd. subsp. praecox, endemic
 Agapanthus walshii L.Bolus, indigenous

Mauhlia
Genus Mauhlia:
 Mauhlia ensifolia Thunb. accepted as Lachenalia ensifolia (Thunb.) J.C.Manning & Goldblatt, indigenous

Agavaceae
Family: Agavaceae,

Agave
Genus Agave:
 Agave americana L. subsp. americana var. americana, not indigenous, invasive
 Agave americana L. subsp. americana var. expansa, not indigenous, invasive
 Agave angustifolia Haw. var. angustifolia, not indigenous
 Agave celsii Hook. var. albicans (Jacobi) Gentry, not indigenous
 Agave decipiens Baker, not indigenous
 Agave sisalana Perrine, not indigenous, invasive
 Agave vivipara L. var. vivipara, not indigenous
 Agave wercklei F.A.C.Weber ex A.Berger, not indigenous

Anthericum
Genus Anthericum:
 Anthericum acutum C.H.Wright, accepted as Chlorophytum acutum (C.H.Wright) Nordal, indigenous
 Anthericum angulicaule Baker, accepted as Chlorophytum angulicaule (Baker) Kativu, indigenous
 Anthericum calyptrocarpum Baker, accepted as Chlorophytum calyptrocarpum (Baker) Kativu, indigenous
 Anthericum cooperi Baker, accepted as Chlorophytum cooperi (Baker) Nordal, indigenous
 Anthericum cyperaceum Kies, accepted as Chlorophytum cyperaceum (Kies) Nordal, indigenous
 Anthericum fasciculatum Baker accepted as Chlorophytum fasciculatum (Baker) Kativu, indigenous
 Anthericum galpinii Baker, accepted as Chlorophytum galpinii (Baker) Kativu	
 Anthericum galpinii Baker var. matabelense (Baker) Oberm. accepted as Chlorophytum galpinii (Baker) Kativu var. matabelense (Baker) Kativu, indigenous
 Anthericum galpinii Baker var. norlindhii (Weim.) Oberm. accepted as Chlorophytum galpinii (Baker) Kativu var. norlindhii (Weim.) Kativu, indigenous
 Anthericum haygarthii (J.M.Wood & M.S.Evans) Oberm. accepted as Chlorophytum haygarthii J.M.Wood & M.S.Evans, indigenous
 Anthericum krauseanum Dinter, accepted as Chlorophytum krauseanum (Dinter) Kativu, indigenous
 Anthericum longistylum Baker, accepted as Chlorophytum recurvifolium (Baker) C.Archer & Kativu, indigenous
 Anthericum radula Baker, accepted as Chlorophytum radula (Baker) Nordal, indigenous
 Anthericum rangei Engl. & K.Krause, accepted as Chlorophytum rangei (Engl. & K.Krause) Nordal, indigenous
 Anthericum saundersiae Baker, accepted as Chlorophytum saundersiae (Baker) Nordal, indigenous
 Anthericum transvaalense Baker, accepted as Chlorophytum transvaalense (Baker) Kativu, indigenous
 Anthericum trichophlebium Baker, accepted as Chlorophytum trichophlebium (Baker) Nordal, indigenous

Chlorophytum
Genus Chlorophytum:
 Chlorophytum acutum (C.H.Wright) Nordal, indigenous
 Chlorophytum angulicaule (Baker) Kativu, indigenous
 Chlorophytum aridum Oberm., indigenous
 Chlorophytum asperum J.C.Manning, endemic
 Chlorophytum bowkeri Baker, indigenous
 Chlorophytum calyptrocarpum (Baker) Kativu, indigenous
 Chlorophytum capense (L.) Voss, endemic
 Chlorophytum comosum (Thunb.) Jacques, indigenous
 Chlorophytum cooperi (Baker) Nordal, indigenous
 Chlorophytum crassinerve (Baker) Oberm. endemic
 Chlorophytum crispum (Thunb.) Baker, endemic
 Chlorophytum cyperaceum (Kies) Nordal, endemic
 Chlorophytum fasciculatum (Baker) Kativu, indigenous
 Chlorophytum galpinii (Baker) Kativu, indigenous
 Chlorophytum galpinii (Baker) Kativu var. galpinii, indigenous
 Chlorophytum galpinii (Baker) Kativu var. matabelense (Baker) Kativu, indigenous
 Chlorophytum galpinii (Baker) Kativu var. norlindhii (Weim.) Kativu, indigenous
 Chlorophytum haygarthii J.M.Wood & M.S.Evans, indigenous
 Chlorophytum krauseanum (Dinter) Kativu, indigenous
 Chlorophytum krookianum Zahlbr. indigenous
 Chlorophytum lewisiae Oberm. endemic
 Chlorophytum macrosporum Baker, indigenous
 Chlorophytum modestum Baker, indigenous
 Chlorophytum monophyllum Oberm. endemic
 Chlorophytum namaquense Schltr. ex Poelln. endemic
 Chlorophytum pauciphyllum Oberm. endemic
 Chlorophytum polyphyllum (Baker) Kativu, accepted as Chlorophytum recurvifolium (Baker) C.Archer & Kativu
 Chlorophytum pulchellum Kunth accepted as Chlorophytum rigidum Kunth
 Chlorophytum radula (Baker) Nordal, endemic
 Chlorophytum rangei (Engl. & K.Krause) Nordal, indigenous
 Chlorophytum recurvifolium (Baker) C.Archer & Kativu, indigenous
 Chlorophytum rigidum Kunth, endemic
 Chlorophytum saundersiae (Baker) Nordal, endemic
 Chlorophytum transvaalense (Baker) Kativu, indigenous
 Chlorophytum trichophlebium (Baker) Nordal, endemic
 Chlorophytum triflorum (Aiton) Kunth, endemic
 Chlorophytum undulatum (Jacq.) Oberm. indigenous
 Chlorophytum viscosum Kunth, indigenous

Furcraea
Genus Furcraea:
 Furcraea foetida (L.) Haw. not indigenous, cultivated, invasive
 Furcraea selloana K.Koch, not indigenous
 Furcraea tuberosa (Mill.) W.T.Aiton, not indigenous

Alliaceae
Family: Alliaceae,

Allium
Genus Allium:
 Allium dregeanum Kunth, accepted as Allium synnotii G.Don, endemic
 Allium synnotii G.Don, endemic
 Allium triquetrum L. not indigenous

Nothoscordum
Genus Nothoscordum:
 Nothoscordum borbonicum Kunth, not indigenous, invasive

Prototulbaghia
Genus Prototulbaghia:
 Prototulbaghia siebertii Vosa, accepted as Tulbaghia siebertii (Vosa) Mich.Moller & G.I.Stafford, endemic

Tulbaghia
Genus Tulbaghia:
 Tulbaghia acutiloba Harv. indigenous
 Tulbaghia alliacea L.f. endemic
 Tulbaghia capensis L. endemic
 Tulbaghia cepacea L.f. var. maritima Vosa, accepted as Tulbaghia maritima Vosa, endemic
 Tulbaghia cernua Ave-Lall. indigenous
 Tulbaghia coddii Vosa & R.B.Burb. endemic
 Tulbaghia cominsii Vosa, endemic
 Tulbaghia dregeana Kunth, endemic
 Tulbaghia galpinii Schltr. endemic
 Tulbaghia karasbergensis R.Glover, accepted as Tulbaghia tenuior K.Krause & Dinter	
 Tulbaghia leucantha Baker, indigenous
 Tulbaghia ludwigiana Harv. indigenous
 Tulbaghia maritima Vosa, endemic
 Tulbaghia montana Vosa, indigenous
 Tulbaghia natalensis Baker, endemic
 Tulbaghia nutans Vosa, endemic
 Tulbaghia pretoriensis Vosa & Condy, endemic
 Tulbaghia siebertii (Vosa) Mich.Moller & G.I.Stafford, endemic
 Tulbaghia simmleri P.Beauv. endemic
 Tulbaghia tenuior K.Krause & Dinter, indigenous
 Tulbaghia transvaalensis Vosa, endemic
 Tulbaghia verdoorniae Vosa & R.B.Burb. endemic
 Tulbaghia violacea Harv. endemic
 Tulbaghia violacea Harv. subsp. macmasteri Vosa, endemic
 Tulbaghia violacea Harv. subsp. violacea, endemic
 Tulbaghia violacea Harv. var. maritima Vosa, accepted as Tulbaghia maritima Vosa, endemic

Amaryllidaceae
Family: Amaryllidaceae,

Amaryllis
Genus Amaryllis:
 Amaryllis belladonna L. endemic
 Amaryllis guttata L. accepted as Crossyne guttata (L.) D.Mull.-Doblies & U.Mull.-Doblies
 Amaryllis paradisicola Snijman, endemic

Ammocharis
Genus Ammocharis:
 Ammocharis coranica (Ker Gawl.) Herb. indigenous
 Ammocharis falcata Herb. accepted as Ammocharis longifolia (L.) M.Roem.	indig
 Ammocharis herrei F.M.Leight. accepted as Ammocharis longifolia (L.) M.Roem.
 Ammocharis longifolia (L.) M.Roem. indigenous

Apodolirion
Genus Apodolirion:
 Apodolirion amyanum D.Mull.-Doblies, endemic
 Apodolirion bolusii Baker, endemic
 Apodolirion buchananii Baker, indigenous
 Apodolirion cedarbergense D.Mull.-Doblies, endemic
 Apodolirion lanceolatum (Thunb.) Baker, endemic
 Apodolirion macowanii Baker, endemic

Bokkeveldia
Genus Bokkeveldia:
 Bokkeveldia aestivalis (Snijman) D.Mull.-Doblies & U.Mull.-Doblies, accepted as Strumaria aestivalis Snijman
 Bokkeveldia perryae (Snijman) D.Mull.-Doblies & U.Mull.-Doblies, accepted as Strumaria perryae Snijman
 Bokkeveldia picta (W.F.Barker) D.Mull.-Doblies & U.Mull.-Doblies, accepted as Strumaria picta W.F.Barker
 Bokkeveldia pubescens (W.F.Barker) D.Mull.-Doblies & U.Mull.-Doblies, accepted as Strumaria pubescens W.F.Barker
 Bokkeveldia salteri (W.F.Barker) D.Mull.-Doblies & U.Mull.-Doblies, accepted as Strumaria salteri W.F.Barker
 Bokkeveldia watermeyeri (L.Bolus) D.Mull.-Doblies & U.Mull.-Doblies, accepted as Strumaria watermeyeri L.Bolus
 Bokkeveldia watermeyeri (L.Bolus) D.Mull.-Doblies & U.Mull.-Doblies subsp. botterkloofensis D.Mull.- accepted as Strumaria watermeyeri L.Bolus subsp. botterkloofensis (D.Mull.-Doblies & U.Mull.-Doblies) Snijman

Boophone
Genus Boophone:
 Boophone disticha (L.f.) Herb. indigenous
 Boophone flava W.F.Barker ex Snijman, accepted as Crossyne flava (W.F.Barker ex Snijman) D.Mull.-Doblies & U.Mull.-Doblies
 Boophone guttata (L.) Herb. accepted as Crossyne guttata (L.) D.Mull.-Doblies & U.Mull.-Doblies
 Boophone haemanthoides F.M.Leight. indigenous
 Boophone pulchra W.F.Barker, accepted as Brunsvigia pulchra (W.F.Barker) D.Mull.-Doblies & U.Mull.-Doblies

Brunsvigia
Genus Brunsvigia:
 Brunsvigia appendiculata F.M.Leight. accepted as Brunsvigia bosmaniae F.M.Leight.
 Brunsvigia bosmaniae F.M.Leight. indigenous
 Brunsvigia comptonii W.F.Barker, endemic
 Brunsvigia elandsmontana Snijman, endemic
 Brunsvigia gariepensis Snijman, indigenous
 Brunsvigia gigantea Heist. accepted as Brunsvigia orientalis (L.) Aiton ex Eckl. indigenous
 Brunsvigia grandiflora Lindl. endemic
 Brunsvigia gregaria R.A.Dyer, endemic
 Brunsvigia herrei F.M.Leight. ex W.F.Barker, indigenous
 Brunsvigia josephinae (Redoute) Ker Gawl. endemic
 Brunsvigia litoralis R.A.Dyer, endemic
 Brunsvigia marginata (Jacq.) Aiton, endemic
 Brunsvigia minor Lindl. accepted as Brunsvigia striata (Jacq.) Aiton
 Brunsvigia namaquana D.Mull.-Doblies & U.Mull.-Doblies, indigenous
 Brunsvigia natalensis Baker, indigenous
 Brunsvigia orientalis (L.) Aiton ex Eckl. endemic
 Brunsvigia pulchra (W.F.Barker) D.Mull.-Doblies & U.Mull.-Doblies, endemic
 Brunsvigia radula (Jacq.) W.T.Aiton, indigenous
 Brunsvigia radulosa Herb. indigenous
 Brunsvigia striata (Jacq.) Aiton, endemic
 Brunsvigia undulata F.M.Leight. endemic

Carpolyza
Genus Carpolyza:
 Carpolyza spiralis (L'Her.) Salisb. accepted as Strumaria spiralis L'Her.

Chlidanthus
Genus Chlidanthus:
 Chlidanthus fragrans Herb. not indigenous, cultivated

Clivia
Genus Clivia:
 Clivia caulescens R.A.Dyer, indigenous
 Clivia gardenii Hook. endemic
 Clivia miniata (Lindl.) Regel, indigenous
 Clivia miniata (Lindl.) Regel var. citrina Watson, indigenous
 Clivia miniata (Lindl.) Regel var. miniata, indigenous
 Clivia mirabilis Rourke, endemic
 Clivia nobilis Lindl. endemic
 Clivia robusta B.G.Murray, Ran, de Lange, Hammett, Truter & Swanev. endemic

Crinum
Genus Crinum:
 Crinum acaule Baker, endemic
 Crinum baumii Harms, accepted as Ammocharis baumii (Harms) Milne-Redh. & Schweick.	
 Crinum bulbispermum (Burm.f.) Milne-Redh. & Schweick. indigenous
 Crinum buphanoides Welw. ex Baker, indigenous
 Crinum campanulatum Herb. endemic
 Crinum crassicaule Baker, indigenous
 Crinum delagoense I.Verd. accepted as Crinum stuhlmannii Baker
 Crinum foetidum I.Verd. accepted as Crinum crassicaule Baker
 Crinum graminicola I.Verd. indigenous
 Crinum lineare L.f. endemic
 Crinum lugardiae N.E.Br. indigenous
 Crinum macowanii Baker, indigenous
 Crinum minimum Milne-Redh. indigenous
 Crinum moorei Hook.f. indigenous
 Crinum paludosum I.Verd. indigenous
 Crinum stuhlmannii Baker, indigenous
 Crinum variabile (Jacq.) Herb. endemic

Crossyne
Genus Crossyne:
 Crossyne flava (W.F.Barker ex Snijman) D.Mull.-Doblies & U.Mull.-Doblies endemic
 Crossyne guttata (L.) D.Mull.-Doblies & U.Mull.-Doblies, endemic

Cyrtanthus
Genus Cyrtanthus:
 Cyrtanthus angustifolius (L.f.) Aiton, endemic
 Cyrtanthus attenuatus R.A.Dyer, indigenous
 Cyrtanthus aureolinus Snijman, indigenous
 Cyrtanthus bicolor R.A.Dyer, indigenous
 Cyrtanthus brachyscyphus Baker, endemic
 Cyrtanthus brachysiphon Hilliard & B.L.Burtt, endemic
 Cyrtanthus breviflorus Harv. indigenous
 Cyrtanthus carneus Lindl. endemic
 Cyrtanthus clavatus (L'Her.) R.A.Dyer, endemic
 Cyrtanthus collinus Ker Gawl. endemic
 Cyrtanthus contractus N.E.Br. indigenous
 Cyrtanthus debilis Snijman, endemic
 Cyrtanthus elatus (Jacq.) Traub, endemic
 Cyrtanthus epiphyticus J.M.Wood, indigenous
 Cyrtanthus erubescens Killick, endemic
 Cyrtanthus eucallus R.A.Dyer, endemic
 Cyrtanthus falcatus R.A.Dyer, endemic
 Cyrtanthus fergusoniae L.Bolus, endemic
 Cyrtanthus flammosus Snijman & Van Jaarsv. endemic
 Cyrtanthus flanaganii Baker, indigenous
 Cyrtanthus flavus P.E.Barnes, endemic
 Cyrtanthus galpinii Baker indigenous
 Cyrtanthus guthrieae L.Bolus, endemic
 Cyrtanthus helictus Lehm. endemic
 Cyrtanthus herrei (F.M.Leight.) R.A.Dyer, indigenous
 Cyrtanthus huttonii Baker, endemic
 Cyrtanthus inaequalis O'Brien, endemic
 Cyrtanthus junodii P.Beauv. endemic
 Cyrtanthus labiatus R.A.Dyer, endemic
 Cyrtanthus leptosiphon Snijman, endemic
 Cyrtanthus leucanthus Schltr. endemic
 Cyrtanthus loddigesianus (Herb.) R.A.Dyer, endemic
 Cyrtanthus lutescens Herb. accepted as Cyrtanthus ochroleucus (Herb.) Burch. ex Steud.
 Cyrtanthus mackenii Hook.f. indigenous
 Cyrtanthus mackenii Hook.f. subsp. mackenii, indigenous
 Cyrtanthus mackenii Hook.f. var. cooperi (Baker) R.A.Dyer, accepted as Cyrtanthus mackenii Hook.f. subsp. cooperi (Baker) Snijman, endemic
 Cyrtanthus macmasteri Snijman, endemic
 Cyrtanthus macowanii Baker, endemic
 Cyrtanthus montanus R.A.Dyer, endemic
 Cyrtanthus nutans R.A.Dyer, indigenous
 Cyrtanthus obliquus (L.f.) Aiton, endemic
 Cyrtanthus obrienii Baker, endemic
 Cyrtanthus ochroleucus (Herb.) Burch. ex Steud. endemic
 Cyrtanthus odorus Ker Gawl. endemic
 Cyrtanthus rhododactylus Stapf, endemic
 Cyrtanthus rotundilobus N.E.Br. endemic
 Cyrtanthus sanguineus (Lindl.) Walp. indigenous
 Cyrtanthus sanguineus (Lindl.) Walp. subsp. sanguineus, indigenous
 Cyrtanthus smithiae Watt ex Harv. endemic
 Cyrtanthus speciosus R.A.Dyer, accepted as Cyrtanthus loddigesianus (Herb.) R.A.Dyer
 Cyrtanthus spiralis Burch. ex Ker Gawl. endemic
 Cyrtanthus staadensis Schonland, endemic
 Cyrtanthus stenanthus Baker, indigenous
 Cyrtanthus stenanthus Baker var. major R.A.Dyer, indigenous
 Cyrtanthus stenanthus Baker var. stenanthus, indigenous
 Cyrtanthus striatus Herb. indigenous
 Cyrtanthus suaveolens Schonland, endemic
 Cyrtanthus taitii G.D.Duncan, endemic
 Cyrtanthus thorncroftii C.H.Wright, endemic
 Cyrtanthus tuckii Baker, indigenous
 Cyrtanthus tuckii Baker var. transvaalensis I.Verd. indigenous
 Cyrtanthus tuckii Baker var. tuckii, endemic
 Cyrtanthus tuckii Baker var. viridilobus I.Verd. endemic
 Cyrtanthus ventricosus Willd. endemic
 Cyrtanthus wellandii Snijman, endemic

Gemmaria
Genus Gemmaria:
 Gemmaria chaplinii (W.F.Barker) D.Mull.-Doblies & U.Mull.-Doblies, accepted as Strumaria chaplinii (W.F.Barker) Snijman
 Gemmaria discifera (Marloth ex Snijman) D.Mull.-Doblies & U.Mull.-Doblies, accepted as Strumaria discifera Marloth ex Snijman subsp. discifera
 Gemmaria gemmata (Ker Gawl.) Salisb. ex D.Mull.-Doblies & U.Mull.-Doblies, accepted as Strumaria gemmata Ker Gawl.
 Gemmaria karooica (W.F.Barker) D.Mull.-Doblies & U.Mull.-Doblies, accepted as Strumaria karooica (W.F.Barker) Snijman
 Gemmaria karooportensis D.Mull.-Doblies & U.Mull.-Doblies, accepted as Strumaria karoopoortensis (D.Mull.-Doblies & U.Mull.-Doblies) Snijman
 Gemmaria leipoldtii (L.Bolus) D.Mull.-Doblies & U.Mull.-Doblies, accepted as Strumaria leipoldtii (L.Bolus) Snijman
 Gemmaria massoniella D.Mull.-Doblies & U.Mull.-Doblies, accepted as Strumaria massoniella (D.Mull.-Doblies & U.Mull.-Doblies) Snijman
 Gemmaria mathewsii (W.F.Barker) D.Mull.-Doblies & U.Mull.-Doblies, accepted as Strumaria pygmaea Snijman
 Gemmaria merxmuelleriana D.Mull.-Doblies & U.Mull.-Doblies, accepted as Strumaria merxmuelleriana (D.Mull.-Doblies & U.Mull.-Doblies) Snijman
 Gemmaria pulcherrima D.Mull.-Doblies & U.Mull.-Doblies, accepted as Hessea pulcherrima (D.Mull.-Doblies & U.Mull.-Doblies) Snijman
 Gemmaria unguiculata (W.F.Barker) D.Mull.-Doblies & U.Mull.-Doblies, accepted as Strumaria unguiculata (W.F.Barker) Snijman

Gethyllis
Genus Gethyllis:
 Gethyllis afra L. endemic
 Gethyllis barkerae D.Mull.-Doblies, indigenous
 Gethyllis barkerae D.Mull.-Doblies subsp. barkerae, endemic
 Gethyllis barkerae D.Mull.-Doblies subsp. paucifolia D.Mull.-Doblies, endemic
 Gethyllis britteniana Baker indigenous
 Gethyllis britteniana Baker subsp. britteniana, endemic
 Gethyllis britteniana Baker subsp. bruynsii D.Mull.-Doblies, indigenous
 Gethyllis britteniana Baker subsp. herrei (L.Bolus) D.Mull.-Doblies, endemic
 Gethyllis campanulata L.Bolus, endemic
 Gethyllis cavidens D.Mull.-Doblies, endemic
 Gethyllis ciliaris (Thunb.) Thunb. indigenous
 Gethyllis ciliaris (Thunb.) Thunb. subsp. ciliaris, endemic
 Gethyllis ciliaris (Thunb.) Thunb. subsp. longituba (L.Bolus) D.Mull.-Doblies, endemic
 Gethyllis fimbriatula D.Mull.-Doblies, endemic
 Gethyllis grandiflora L.Bolus, endemic
 Gethyllis gregoriana D.Mull.-Doblies, endemic
 Gethyllis hallii D.Mull.-Doblies, endemic
 Gethyllis heinzeana D.Mull.-Doblies, indigenous
 Gethyllis kaapensis D.Mull.-Doblies, endemic
 Gethyllis lanuginosa Marloth, endemic
 Gethyllis lata L.Bolus, indigenous
 Gethyllis lata L.Bolus subsp. lata, endemic
 Gethyllis lata L.Bolus subsp. orbicularis, D.Mull.-Doblies, endemic
 Gethyllis latifolia Masson ex Baker, endemic
 Gethyllis linearis L.Bolus, endemic
 Gethyllis longistyla Bolus, endemic
 Gethyllis marginata D.Mull.-Doblies, endemic
 Gethyllis namaquensis (Schonland) Oberm. indigenous
 Gethyllis oligophylla D.Mull.-Doblies, indigenous
 Gethyllis oliverorum D.Mull.-Doblies, endemic
 Gethyllis pectinata D.Mull.-Doblies, endemic
 Gethyllis polyanthera Sol. ex Britten, accepted as Gethyllis ciliaris (Thunb.) Thunb. subsp. ciliaris, indigenous
 Gethyllis roggeveldensis D.Mull.-Doblies, endemic
 Gethyllis setosa Marloth, endemic
 Gethyllis spiralis (Thunb.) Thunb. indigenous
 Gethyllis transkarooica D.Mull.-Doblies, indigenous
 Gethyllis undulata Herb. accepted as Gethyllis ciliaris (Thunb.) Thunb. subsp. ciliaris
 Gethyllis uteana D.Mull.-Doblies, endemic
 Gethyllis verrucosa Marloth, endemic
 Gethyllis verticillata R.Br. ex Herb. endemic
 Gethyllis villosa (Thunb.) Thunb. endemic

Haemanthus
Genus Haemanthus:
 Haemanthus albiflos Jacq. endemic
 Haemanthus amarylloides Jacq. indigenous
 Haemanthus amarylloides Jacq. subsp. amarylloides, endemic
 Haemanthus amarylloides Jacq. subsp. polyanthus Snijman, endemic
 Haemanthus amarylloides Jacq. subsp. toximontanus Snijman, endemic
 Haemanthus barkerae Snijman, endemic
 Haemanthus canaliculatus Levyns,  endemic
 Haemanthus carneus Ker Gawl. endemic
 Haemanthus coccineus L. indigenous
 Haemanthus crispus Snijman, endemic
 Haemanthus dasyphyllus Snijman, endemic
 Haemanthus deformis Hook.f. endemic
 Haemanthus graniticus Snijman, endemic
 Haemanthus humilis Jacq. indigenous
 Haemanthus humilis Jacq. subsp. hirsutus (Baker) Snijman, indigenous
 Haemanthus humilis Jacq. subsp. humilis, indigenous
 Haemanthus lanceifolius Jacq. indigenous
 Haemanthus montanus Baker, indigenous
 Haemanthus namaquensis R.A.Dyer, indigenous
 Haemanthus nortieri Isaac, endemic
 Haemanthus pauculifolius Snijman & A.E.van Wyk, indigenous
 Haemanthus pubescens L.f. indigenous
 Haemanthus pubescens L.f. subsp. arenicola Snijman indigenous
 Haemanthus pubescens L.f. subsp. leipoldtii Snijman, endemic
 Haemanthus pubescens L.f. subsp. pubescens, endemic
 Haemanthus pumilio Jacq. endemic
 Haemanthus sanguineus Jacq. endemic
 Haemanthus sessiliflorus Dinter, accepted as Massonia sessiliflora (Dinter) Mart.-Azorin, M.B.Crespo, M.Pinter & Wetschnig, indigenous
 Haemanthus tristis Snijman, endemic
 Haemanthus unifoliatus Snijman, endemic

Hessea
Genus Hessea:
 Hessea brachyscypha Baker, accepted as Hessea breviflora Herb.
 Hessea breviflora Herb. endemic
 Hessea cinnabarina D.Mull.-Doblies & U.Mull.-Doblies, accepted as Hessea stellaris (Jacq.) Herb.
 Hessea cinnamomea (L'Her.) T.Durand & Schinz, endemic
 Hessea incana Snijman, endemic
 Hessea longituba D.Mull.-Doblies & U.Mull.-Doblies, accepted as Hessea breviflora Herb.
 Hessea mathewsii W.F.Barker, endemic
 Hessea monticola Snijman, endemic
 Hessea pilosula D.Mull.-Doblies & U.Mull.-Doblies, endemic
 Hessea pulcherrima (D.Mull.-Doblies & U.Mull.-Doblies) Snijman, endemic
 Hessea pusilla Snijman, endemic
 Hessea speciosa Snijman, indigenous
 Hessea stellaris (Jacq.) Herb. endemic
 Hessea stenosiphon (Snijman) D.Mull.-Doblies & U.Mull.-Doblies, endemic
 Hessea tenuipedicellata Snijman, endemic
 Hessea undosa Snijman, endemic
 Hessea weberlingiorum D.Mull.-Doblies & U.Mull.-Doblies, accepted as Hessea stellaris (Jacq.) Herb.
 Hessea zeyheri Baker, accepted as Hessea breviflora Herb.

Leucojum
Genus Leucojum:
 Leucojum aestivum L. not indigenous, cultivated

Namaquanula
Genus Namaquanula:
 Namaquanula bruce-bayeri D.Mull.-Doblies & U.Mull.-Doblies, indigenous

Narcissus
Genus Narcissus:
 Narcissus tazetta L. subsp. tazetta,not indigenous, cultivated

Nerine
Genus Nerine:
 Nerine angustifolia (Baker) Baker, indigenous
 Nerine appendiculata Baker, endemic
 Nerine bowdenii W.Watson, endemic
 Nerine bowdenii W.Watson 'Quinton Wells' E.B.Anderson, accepted as Nerine bowdenii W.Watson subsp. wellsii C.A.Norris ex G.D.Duncan indigenous
 Nerine bowdenii W.Watson subsp. wellsii C.A.Norris ex G.D.Duncan, endemic
 Nerine bowdenii Watson subsp. bowdenii, endemic
 Nerine bowdenii Watson subsp. wellsii C.A.Norris, accepted as Nerine bowdenii W.Watson subsp. wellsii C.A.Norris ex G.D.Duncan, indigenous
 Nerine filamentosa W.F.Barker, endemic
 Nerine filifolia Baker, endemic
 Nerine frithii L.Bolus, endemic
 Nerine gaberonensis Bremek. & Oberm. indigenous
 Nerine gibsonii Douglas, endemic
 Nerine gracilis R.A.Dyer, endemic
 Nerine hesseoides L.Bolus, endemic
 Nerine humilis (Jacq.) Herb. endemic
 Nerine huttoniae Schonland, endemic
 Nerine krigei W.F.Barker, endemic
 Nerine laticoma (Ker Gawl.) T.Durand & Schinz, indigenous
 Nerine marincowitzii Snijman, endemic
 Nerine masoniorum L.Bolus, endemic
 Nerine pancratioides Baker, endemic
 Nerine platypetala McNeil, endemic
 Nerine pudica Hook.f. endemic
 Nerine rehmannii (Baker) L.Bolus, indigenous
 Nerine ridleyi E.Phillips, endemic
 Nerine sarniensis (L.) Herb. endemic
 Nerine transvaalensis L.Bolus, indigenous
 Nerine undulata (L.) Herb. endemic

Pancratium
Genus Pancratium:
 Pancratium tenuifolium Hochst. ex A.Rich. indigenous

Scadoxus
Genus Scadoxus:
 Scadoxus membranaceus (Baker) Friis & Nordal, endemic
 Scadoxus multiflorus (Martyn) Raf. indigenous
 Scadoxus multiflorus (Martyn) Raf. subsp. katharinae (Baker) Friis & Nordal, indigenous
 Scadoxus multiflorus (Martyn) Raf. subsp. multiflorus, indigenous
 Scadoxus puniceus (L.) Friis & Nordal, indigenous

Strumaria
Genus Strumaria:
 Strumaria aestivalis Snijman, endemic
 Strumaria angustifolia Jacq.	Strumaria truncata Jacq.
 Strumaria barbarae Oberm. indigenous
 Strumaria bidentata Schinz, indigenous
 Strumaria chaplinii (W.F.Barker) Snijman, endemic
 Strumaria discifera Marloth ex Snijman, indigenous
 Strumaria discifera Marloth ex Snijman subsp. bulbifera Snijman, endemic
 Strumaria discifera Marloth ex Snijman subsp. discifera, indigenous
 Strumaria gemmata Ker Gawl. endemic
 Strumaria karooica (W.F.Barker) Snijman, endemic
 Strumaria karoopoortensis (D.Mull.-Doblies & U.Mull.-Doblies) Snijman, endemic
 Strumaria leipoldtii (L.Bolus) Snijman, endemic
 Strumaria linguaefolia Jacq. accepted as Strumaria truncata Jacq.
 Strumaria luteoloba Snijman, indigenous
 Strumaria massoniella (D.Mull.-Doblies & U.Mull.-Doblies) Snijman, endemic
 Strumaria merxmuelleriana (D.Mull.-Doblies & U.Mull.-Doblies) Snijman, endemic
 Strumaria perryae Snijman, endemic
 Strumaria picta W.F.Barker, endemic
 Strumaria prolifera Snijman, endemic
 Strumaria pubescens W.F.Barker, endemic
 Strumaria pygmaea Snijman, endemic
 Strumaria rubella Jacq. accepted as Strumaria truncata Jacq.
 Strumaria salteri W.F.Barker, endemic
 Strumaria spiralis L'Her. endemic
 Strumaria tenella (L.f.) Snijman, indigenous
 Strumaria tenella (L.f.) Snijman, subsp. orientalis Snijman		indig
 Strumaria tenella (L.f.) Snijman subsp. tenella, endemic
 Strumaria truncata Jacq. endemic
 Strumaria unguiculata (W.F.Barker) Snijman, endemic
 Strumaria villosa Snijman, endemic
 Strumaria watermeyeri L.Bolus, indigenous
 Strumaria watermeyeri L.Bolus subsp. botterkloofensis (D.Mull.-Doblies & U.Mull.-Doblies) Snijman, endemic
 Strumaria watermeyeri L.Bolus subsp. watermeyeri, endemic

Tedingea
Genus Tedingea:
 Tedingea pygmaea (Snijman) D.Mull.-Doblies & U.Mull.-Doblies accepted as Strumaria pygmaea Snijman
 Tedingea tenella (L.f.) D.Mull.-Doblies & U.Mull.-Doblies,accepted as Strumaria tenella (L.f.) Snijman subsp. tenella

Zephyranthes
Genus Zephyranthes:
 Zephyranthes minuta (Kunth) D.Dietr., syn. Z. grandiflora, not indigenous, cultivated
 Zephyranthes robusta (Herb.) Baker, syn. Habranthus robustus, not indigenous, cultivated

Asparagaceae
Family: Asparagaceae,

Asparagus
Genus Asparagus:
 Asparagus acocksii Jessop, indigenous
 Asparagus aethiopicus L. indigenous
 Asparagus africanus Lam. indigenous
 Asparagus aggregatus (Oberm.) Fellingham & N.L.Mey. endemic
 Asparagus alopecurus (Oberm.) Malcomber & Sebsebe, endemic
 Asparagus angusticladus (Jessop) J.-P.Lebrun & Stork, indigenous
 Asparagus asparagoides (L.) Druce, indigenous
 Asparagus aspergillus Jessop, indigenous
 Asparagus bayeri (Oberm.) Fellingham & N.L.Mey. endemic
 Asparagus bechuanicus Baker, indigenous
 Asparagus biflorus (Oberm.) Fellingham & N.L.Mey. indigenous
 Asparagus buchananii Baker, indigenous
 Asparagus burchellii Baker, endemic
 Asparagus capensis L. indigenous
 Asparagus capensis L. var. capensis, indigenous
 Asparagus capensis L. var. litoralis Suess. & Karl, indigenous
 Asparagus clareae (Oberm.) Fellingham & N.L.Mey. endemic
 Asparagus coddii (Oberm.) Fellingham & N.L.Mey., indigenous
 Asparagus concinnus (Baker) Kies, indigenous
 Asparagus confertus K.Krause, endemic
 Asparagus cooperi Baker, indigenous
 Asparagus crassicladus Jessop, endemic
 Asparagus declinatus L. indigenous
 Asparagus densiflorus (Kunth) Jessop, indigenous
 Asparagus denudatus (Kunth) Baker, indigenous
 Asparagus devenishii (Oberm.) Fellingham & N.L.Mey. endemic
 Asparagus divaricatus (Oberm.) Fellingham & N.L.Mey. indigenous
 Asparagus edulis (Oberm.) J.-P.Lebrun & Stork, indigenous
 Asparagus elephantinus S.M.Burrows, endemic
 Asparagus exsertus (Oberm.) Fellingham & N.L.Mey. endemic
 Asparagus exuvialis Burch. indigenous
 Asparagus exuvialis Burch. forma ecklonii (Baker) Fellingham & N.L.Mey. indigenous
 Asparagus exuvialis Burch. forma exuvialis, indigenous
 Asparagus falcatus L. indigenous
 Asparagus fasciculatus Thunb. indigenous
 Asparagus filicladus (Oberm.) Fellingham & N.L.Mey. endemic
 Asparagus flavicaulis (Oberm.) Fellingham & N.L.Mey. indigenous
 Asparagus flavicaulis (Oberm.) Fellingham & N.L.Mey. subsp. flavicaulis, indigenous
 Asparagus flavicaulis (Oberm.) Fellingham & N.L.Mey. subsp. setulosus (Oberm.) Fellingham & N.L.Mey. endemic
 Asparagus fourei (Oberm.) Fellingham & N.L.Mey. endemic
 Asparagus fractiflexus (Oberm.) Fellingham & N.L.Mey. endemic
 Asparagus glaucus Kies, indigenous
 Asparagus graniticus (Oberm.) Fellingham & N.L.Mey. indigenous
 Asparagus hirsutus S.M.Burrows, indigenous
 Asparagus intricatus (Oberm.) Fellingham & N.L.Mey. endemic
 Asparagus juniperoides Engl. indigenous
 Asparagus kraussianus (Kunth) J.F.Macbr. endemic
 Asparagus krebsianus (Kunth) Jessop, endemic
 Asparagus laricinus Burch. indigenous
 Asparagus lignosus Burm.f. endemic
 Asparagus lynetteae (Oberm.) Fellingham & N.L.Mey. indigenous
 Asparagus macowanii Baker, endemic
 Asparagus mariae (Oberm.) Fellingham & N.L.Mey. endemic
 Asparagus microraphis (Kunth) Baker, indigenous
 Asparagus minutiflorus (Kunth) Baker, indigenous
 Asparagus mollis (Oberm.) Fellingham & N.L.Mey. endemic
 Asparagus mucronatus Jessop, endemic
 Asparagus multiflorus Baker, endemic
 Asparagus multituberosus R.A.Dyer, endemic
 Asparagus natalensis (Baker) J.-P.Lebrun & Stork, indigenous
 Asparagus nelsii Schinz, indigenous
 Asparagus nodulosus (Oberm.) J.-P.Lebrun & Stork, indigenous
 Asparagus oliveri (Oberm.) Fellingham & N.L.Mey. endemic
 Asparagus ovatus T.M.Salter, endemic
 Asparagus oxyacanthus Baker, endemic
 Asparagus pearsonii Kies, indigenous
 Asparagus plumosus Baker, indigenous
 Asparagus racemosus Willd, indigenous
 Asparagus ramosissimus Baker, indigenous
 Asparagus recurvispinus (Oberm.) Fellingham & N.L.Mey. endemic
 Asparagus retrofractus L. indigenous
 Asparagus rigidus Jessop, endemic
 Asparagus rubicundus P.J.Bergius, endemic
 Asparagus saundersiae Baker, indigenous
 Asparagus scandens Thunb. endemic
 Asparagus schroederi Engl. indigenous
 Asparagus sekukuniensis (Oberm.) Fellingham & N.L.Mey. endemic
 Asparagus setaceus (Kunth) Jessop, indigenous
 Asparagus spinescens Steud. ex Roem. & Schult. endemic
 Asparagus stellatus Baker, indigenous
 Asparagus stipulaceus Lam. endemic
 Asparagus striatus (L.f.) Thunb. endemic
 Asparagus suaveolens Burch. indigenous
 Asparagus subulatus Thunb. endemic
 Asparagus sylvicola S.M.Burrows, endemic
 Asparagus transvaalensis (Oberm.) Fellingham & N.L.Mey. indigenous
 Asparagus undulatus (L.f.) Thunb. indigenous
 Asparagus virgatus Baker, indigenous
 Asparagus volubilis Thunb. endemic

Behnia
Genus Behnia:
 Behnia reticulata (Thunb.) Didr. indigenous

Myrsiphyllum
Genus Myrsiphyllum:
 Myrsiphyllum alopecurum Oberm. accepted as Asparagus alopecurus (Oberm.) Malcomber & Sebsebe
 Myrsiphyllum asparagoides (L.) Willd. accepted as Asparagus asparagoides (L.) Druce
 Myrsiphyllum declinatum (L.) Oberm. accepted as Asparagus declinatus L.
 Myrsiphyllum fasciculatum (Thunb.) Oberm. accepted as Asparagus fasciculatus Thunb.
 Myrsiphyllum juniperoides (Engl.) Oberm. accepted as Asparagus juniperoides Engl.
 Myrsiphyllum kraussianum Kunth accepted as Asparagus kraussianus (Kunth) J.F.Macbr.
 Myrsiphyllum multituberosum (R.A.Dyer) Oberm. accepted as Asparagus multituberosus R.A.Dyer
 Myrsiphyllum ovatum (T.M.Salter) Oberm. accepted as Asparagus ovatus T.M.Salter
 Myrsiphyllum ramosissimum (Baker) Oberm. accepted as Asparagus ramosissimus Baker
 Myrsiphyllum scandens (Thunb.) Oberm. accepted as Asparagus scandens Thunb.
 Myrsiphyllum undulatum (L.f.) Oberm. accepted as Asparagus undulatus (L.f.) Thunb.
 Myrsiphyllum volubile (Thunb.) Oberm. accepted as Asparagus volubilis Thunb.

Protasparagus
Genus Protasparagus:
 Protasparagus acocksii (Jessop) Oberm. accepted as Asparagus acocksii Jessop
 Protasparagus aethiopicus (L.) Oberm. accepted as Asparagus aethiopicus L.
 Protasparagus africanus (Lam.) Oberm. accepted as Asparagus africanus Lam.
 Protasparagus aggregatus Oberm. accepted as Asparagus aggregatus (Oberm.) Fellingham & N.L.Mey.
 Protasparagus angusticladus (Jessop) Oberm. accepted as Asparagus angusticladus (Jessop) J.-P.Lebrun & Stork
 Protasparagus aspergillus (Jessop) Oberm. accepted as Asparagus aspergillus Jessop
 Protasparagus bayeri Oberm. accepted as Asparagus bayeri (Oberm.) Fellingham & N.L.Mey.
 Protasparagus bechuanicus (Baker) Oberm. accepted as Asparagus bechuanicus Baker
 Protasparagus biflorus Oberm. accepted as Asparagus biflorus (Oberm.) Fellingham & N.L.Mey.
 Protasparagus buchananii (Baker) Oberm. accepted as Asparagus buchananii Baker
 Protasparagus burchellii (Baker) Oberm. accepted as Asparagus burchellii Baker
 Protasparagus capensis (L.) Oberm. var. capensis accepted as Asparagus capensis L. var. capensis
 Protasparagus capensis (L.) Oberm. var. litoralis Suess. & Karl accepted as Asparagus capensis L. var. litoralis Suess. & Karl
 Protasparagus clareae Oberm. accepted as Asparagus clareae (Oberm.) Fellingham & N.L.Mey.
 Protasparagus coddii Oberm. accepted as Asparagus coddii (Oberm.) Fellingham & N.L.Mey.
 Protasparagus concinnus (Baker) Oberm. & Immelman accepted as Asparagus concinnus (Baker) Kies
 Protasparagus confertus (K.Krause) Oberm. accepted as Asparagus confertus K.Krause
 Protasparagus cooperi (Baker) Oberm. accepted as Asparagus cooperi Baker
 Protasparagus crassicladus (Jessop) Oberm. accepted as Asparagus crassicladus Jessop
 Protasparagus densiflorus (Kunth) Oberm. accepted as Asparagus densiflorus (Kunth) Jessop
 Protasparagus denudatus (Kunth) Oberm. accepted as Asparagus denudatus (Kunth) Baker
 Protasparagus devenishii Oberm. accepted as Asparagus devenishii (Oberm.) Fellingham & N.L.Mey.
 Protasparagus divaricatus Oberm. accepted as Asparagus divaricatus (Oberm.) Fellingham & N.L.Mey.
 Protasparagus edulis Oberm. accepted as Asparagus edulis (Oberm.) J.-P.Lebrun & Stork
 Protasparagus exsertus Oberm. accepted as Asparagus exsertus (Oberm.) Fellingham & N.L.Mey.
 Protasparagus exuvialis (Burch.) Oberm. forma ecklonii (Baker) Oberm. accepted as Asparagus exuvialis Burch. forma ecklonii (Baker) Fellingham & N.L.Mey.
 Protasparagus exuvialis (Burch.) Oberm. forma exuvialis accepted as Asparagus exuvialis Burch. forma exuvialis
 Protasparagus falcatus (L.) Oberm. accepted as Asparagus falcatus L.
 Protasparagus filicladus Oberm. accepted as Asparagus filicladus (Oberm.) Fellingham & N.L.Mey.
 Protasparagus flavicaulis Oberm. subsp. flavicaulis accepted as Asparagus flavicaulis (Oberm.) Fellingham & N.L.Mey. subsp. flavicaulis
 Protasparagus flavicaulis Oberm. subsp. setulosus Oberm. accepted as Asparagus flavicaulis (Oberm.) Fellingham & N.L.Mey. subsp. setulosus (Oberm.) Fellingham & N.L.Mey.
 Protasparagus fouriei Oberm. accepted as Asparagus fourei (Oberm.) Fellingham & N.L.Mey.
 Protasparagus fractiflexus Oberm. accepted as Asparagus fractiflexus (Oberm.) Fellingham & N.L.Mey.
 Protasparagus glaucus (Kies) Oberm. accepted as Asparagus glaucus Kies
 Protasparagus graniticus Oberm. accepted as Asparagus graniticus (Oberm.) Fellingham & N.L.Mey.
 Protasparagus intricatus Oberm. accepted as Asparagus intricatus (Oberm.) Fellingham & N.L.Mey.
 Protasparagus krebsianus (Kunth) Oberm. accepted as Asparagus krebsianus (Kunth) Jessop
 Protasparagus laricinus (Burch.) Oberm. accepted as Asparagus laricinus Burch.
 Protasparagus lignosus (Burm.f.) Oberm. accepted as Asparagus lignosus Burm.f.
 Protasparagus longicladus (N.E.Br.) B.Mathew, accepted as Asparagus longicladus N.E.Br.	
 Protasparagus lynettae Oberm. accepted as Asparagus lynetteae (Oberm.) Fellingham & N.L.Mey.
 Protasparagus macowanii (Baker) Oberm. accepted as Asparagus macowanii Baker
 Protasparagus mariae Oberm. accepted as Asparagus mariae (Oberm.) Fellingham & N.L.Mey.
 Protasparagus microraphis (Kunth) Oberm. accepted as Asparagus microraphis (Kunth) Baker
 Protasparagus minutiflorus (Kunth) Oberm. accepted as Asparagus minutiflorus (Kunth) Baker
 Protasparagus mollis Oberm. accepted as Asparagus mollis (Oberm.) Fellingham & N.L.Mey.
 Protasparagus mucronatus (Jessop) Oberm. accepted as Asparagus mucronatus Jessop
 Protasparagus multiflorus (Baker) Oberm. accepted as Asparagus multiflorus Baker
 Protasparagus natalensis (Baker) Oberm. accepted as Asparagus natalensis (Baker) J.-P.Lebrun & Stork
 Protasparagus nelsii (Schinz) Oberm. accepted as Asparagus nelsii Schinz
 Protasparagus nodulosus Oberm. accepted as Asparagus nodulosus (Oberm.) J.-P.Lebrun & Stork
 Protasparagus oliveri Oberm. accepted as Asparagus oliveri (Oberm.) Fellingham & N.L.Mey.
 Protasparagus oxyacanthus (Baker) Oberm. accepted as Asparagus oxyacanthus Baker
 Protasparagus pearsonii (Kies) Oberm. accepted as Asparagus pearsonii Kies
 Protasparagus pendulus Oberm. accepted as Asparagus pendulus (Oberm.) J.-P.Lebrun & Stork	
 Protasparagus plumosus (Baker) Oberm. accepted as Asparagus plumosus Baker
 Protasparagus racemosus (Willd.) Oberm. accepted as Asparagus racemosus Willd.
 Protasparagus recurvispinus Oberm. accepted as Asparagus recurvispinus (Oberm.) Fellingham & N.L.Mey.
 Protasparagus retrofractus (L.) Oberm. accepted as Asparagus retrofractus L.
 Protasparagus rigidus (Jessop) Oberm. accepted as Asparagus rigidus Jessop
 Protasparagus rubicundus (P.J.Bergius) Oberm. accepted as Asparagus rubicundus P.J.Bergius
 Protasparagus schroederi (Engl.) Oberm. accepted as Asparagus schroederi Engl.
 Protasparagus sekukuniensis Oberm. accepted as Asparagus sekukuniensis (Oberm.) Fellingham & N.L.Mey.
 Protasparagus setaceus (Kunth) Oberm. accepted as Asparagus setaceus (Kunth) Jessop
 Protasparagus spinescens (Steud. ex Roem. & Schult.) Oberm. accepted as Asparagus spinescens Steud. ex Roem. & Schult.
 Protasparagus stellatus (Baker) Oberm. accepted as Asparagus stellatus Baker
 Protasparagus stipulaceus (Lam.) Oberm. accepted as Asparagus stipulaceus Lam.
 Protasparagus striatus (L.f.) Oberm. accepted as Asparagus striatus (L.f.) Thunb.
 Protasparagus suaveolens (Burch.) Oberm. accepted as Asparagus suaveolens Burch.
 Protasparagus subulatus (Thunb.) Oberm. accepted as Asparagus subulatus Thunb.
 Protasparagus transvaalensis Oberm. accepted as Asparagus transvaalensis (Oberm.) Fellingham & N.L.Mey.
 Protasparagus virgatus (Baker) Oberm. accepted as Asparagus virgatus Baker

Asphodelaceae
 
Family: Asphodelaceae, 21 genera have been recorded. Not all are necessarily currently accepted.

Genus Aloe:
Genus Aloiampelos:
Genus Aloiampelos:
Genus Aloidendron:
Genus Apicra:
Genus Aristaloe:
Genus Asphodelus:
Genus Astroloba:
Genus Bulbine:
Genus Bulbinella:
Genus Catevala:
Genus Chortolirion:
Genus Gasteria:
Genus Gonialoe:
Genus Haworthia:
Genus Kniphofia:
Genus Kumara:
Genus Leptaloe:
Genus Poellnitzia:
Genus Trachyandra:
Genus Tulista:

Hemerocallidaceae
Family: Hemerocallidaceae,

Caesia
Genus Caesia:
 Caesia capensis (Bolus) Oberm. endemic
 Caesia contorta (L.f.) T.Durand & Schinz, endemic
 Caesia sabulosa Boatwr. & J.C.Manning, indigenous

Cianella
Genus Dianella:
 Dianella caerulea Sims, not indigenous, cultivated

Phormium
Genus Phormium:
 Phormium aloides L.f. accepted as Lachenalia aloides (L.f.) Engl. indigenous
 Phormium bulbiferum Cirillo, accepted as Lachenalia bulbifera (Cirillo) Engl. indigenous
 Phormium hirtum Thunb. accepted as Lachenalia hirta (Thunb.) Thunb. indigenous

Hyacinthaceae

Family: Hyacinthaceae, 43 genera have been recorded. Not all are necessarily currently accepted.

Genus Albuca:
Genus Amphisiphon:
Genus Baeoterpe:
Genus Bowiea:
Genus Brachyscypha:
Genus Coelanthus:
Genus Daubenya:
Genus Desertia:
Genus Dipcadi:
Genus Drimia:
Genus Drimiopsis:
Genus Eliokarmos:
Genus Elsiea:
Genus Ethesia:
Genus Eucomis:
Genus Galtonia:
Genus Hyacinthus:
Genus Lachenalia:
Genus Ledebouria:
Genus Lindneria:
Genus Litanthus:
Genus Massonia:
Genus Merwilla:
Genus Nicipe:
Genus Ornithogalum:
Genus Periboea:
Genus Polyanthes:
Genus Polyxena:
Genus Pseudogaltonia:
Genus Pseudoprospero:
Genus Resnova:
Genus Rhadamanthus:
Genus Schizobasis:
Genus Schizocarphus:
Genus Scilla:
Genus Spetaea:
Genus Stellarioides:
Genus Tenicroa:
Genus Thuranthos:
Genus Trimelopter:
Genus Urginea:
Genus Veltheimia
Genus Whiteheadia:

Hypoxidaceae
Family: Hypoxidaceae:

Empodium
Genus Empodium:
 Empodium elongatum (Nel) B.L.Burtt, indigenous
 Empodium flexile (Nel) M.F.Thomps. ex Snijman, endemic
 Empodium gloriosum (Nel) B.L.Burtt, endemic
 Empodium monophyllum (Nel) B.L.Burtt, indigenous
 Empodium namaquensis (Baker) M.F.Thomps. endemic
 Empodium occidentale (Nel) B.L.Burtt, accepted as Pauridia alticola Snijman & Kocyan
 Empodium plicatum (Thunb.) Garside, endemic
 Empodium veratrifolium (Willd.) M.F.Thomps. endemic

Hypoxis
Genus Hypoxis:
 Hypoxis acuminata Baker, indigenous
 Hypoxis angustifolia Lam. indigenous
 Hypoxis angustifolia Lam. var. angustifolia, indigenous
 Hypoxis angustifolia Lam. var. buchananii Baker, indigenous
 Hypoxis argentea Harv. ex Baker, indigenous
 Hypoxis argentea Harv. ex Baker var. argentea, indigenous
 Hypoxis argentea Harv. ex Baker var. sericea Baker, indigenous
 Hypoxis barbacenioides Harv. ex Baker, accepted as Xerophyta elegans (Balf.) Baker
 Hypoxis colchicifolia Baker, endemic
 Hypoxis cordata Nel, accepted as Hypoxis rigidula Baker var. rigidula
 Hypoxis costata Baker, indigenous
 Hypoxis decumbens L. not indigenous
 Hypoxis distachya Nel, accepted as Hypoxis colchicifolia Baker
 Hypoxis ecklonii Baker, accepted as Hypoxis floccosa Baker
 Hypoxis elliptica Nel, accepted as Hypoxis rigidula Baker var. rigidula
 Hypoxis exaltata Nel, endemic
 Hypoxis filiformis Baker, indigenous
 Hypoxis flanaganii Baker, endemic
 Hypoxis floccosa Baker, endemic
 Hypoxis galpinii Baker, indigenous
 Hypoxis gerrardii Baker, indigenous
 Hypoxis gilgiana Nel, accepted as Hypoxis colchicifolia Baker
 Hypoxis hemerocallidea Fisch. C.A.Mey. & Ave-Lall. indigenous
 Hypoxis interjecta Nel, endemic
 Hypoxis iridifolia Baker, indigenous
 Hypoxis kraussiana Buchinger, indigenous
 Hypoxis lata Nel, indigenous
 Hypoxis limicola B.L.Burtt, indigenous
 Hypoxis longifolia Baker, endemic
 Hypoxis ludwigii Baker, indigenous
 Hypoxis membranacea Baker, indigenous
 Hypoxis multiceps Buchinger ex Baker, indigenous
 Hypoxis neliana Schinz, indigenous
 Hypoxis nivea Y.Singh, indigenous
 Hypoxis obconica Nel, endemic
 Hypoxis obliqua Jacq. accepted as Hypoxis villosa L.f. var. obliqua (Jacq.) Baker
 Hypoxis oblonga Nel, endemic
 Hypoxis obtusa Burch. accepted as Hypoxis iridifolia Baker
 Hypoxis obtusa Burch. ex Ker Gawl. indigenous
 Hypoxis parvifolia Baker, indigenous
 Hypoxis parvula Baker, indigenous
 Hypoxis parvula Baker var. albiflora B.L.Burtt, endemic
 Hypoxis parvula Baker var. parvula, indigenous
 Hypoxis patula Nel, endemic
 Hypoxis rigidula Baker, indigenous
 Hypoxis rigidula Baker var. pilosissima Baker, indigenous
 Hypoxis rigidula Baker var. rigidula, indigenous
 Hypoxis sagittata Nel, endemic
 Hypoxis setosa Baker, endemic
 Hypoxis sobolifera Jacq. indigenous
 Hypoxis sobolifera Jacq. var. sobolifera (Jacq.) Nel, endemic
 Hypoxis stellipilis Ker Gawl. endemic
 Hypoxis tetramera Hilliard & B.L.Burtt, indigenous
 Hypoxis uniflorata Markotter, endemic
 Hypoxis vellosioides Harv. ex Baker, accepted as Xerophyta retinervis Baker var. retinervis
 Hypoxis villosa L.f. indigenous
 Hypoxis villosa L.f. var. obliqua (Jacq.) Baker, indigenous
 Hypoxis villosa L.f. var. pannosa Baker, indigenous
 Hypoxis villosa L.f. var. villosa, indigenous
 Hypoxis woodii Baker, indigenous
 Hypoxis zeyheri Baker, endemic

Pauridia
Genus Pauridia:
 Pauridia acida (Nel) Snijman & Kocyan, indigenous
 Pauridia aemulans (Nel) Snijman & Kocyan, indigenous
 Pauridia affinis (Schult. & Schult.f.) Snijman & Kocyan, indigenous
 Pauridia alba (Thunb.) Snijman & Kocyan, indigenous
 Pauridia alticola Snijman & Kocyan, indigenous
 Pauridia aquatica (L.f.) Snijman & Kocyan, indigenous
 Pauridia breviscapa Snijman, indigenous
 Pauridia canaliculata (Garside) Snijman & Kocyan, indigenous
 Pauridia capensis (L.) Snijman & Kocyan, indigenous
 Pauridia curculigoides (Bolus) Snijman & Kocyan, indigenous
 Pauridia etesionamibensis (U.Mull.-Doblies, Mark.Ackermann, Weigend & D.Mull.-Doblies) Snijman & Koc, indigenous
 Pauridia flaccida (Nel) Snijman & Kocyan, indigenous
 Pauridia gracilipes (Schltr.) Snijman & Kocyan, indigenous
 Pauridia gracilipes (Schltr.) Snijman & Kocyan subsp. gracilipes, indigenous
 Pauridia gracilipes (Schltr.) Snijman & Kocyan subsp. speciosa Snijman, indigenous
 Pauridia linearis (Andrews) Snijman & Kocyan, indigenous
 Pauridia longituba M.F.Thomps. endemic
 Pauridia maryae Snijman, indigenous
 Pauridia maximiliani (Schltr.) Snijman & Kocyan, indigenous
 Pauridia minuta (L.f.) T.Durand & Schinz, endemic
 Pauridia monophylla (Schltr. ex Baker) Snijman & Kocyan, indigenous
 Pauridia monticola Snijman, indigenous
 Pauridia monticola Snijman subsp. monticola, indigenous
 Pauridia monticola Snijman subsp. nubigena Snijman, indigenous
 Pauridia nana (Snijman) Snijman & Kocyan, indigenous
 Pauridia ovata (L.f.) Snijman & Kocyan, indigenous
 Pauridia pudica Snijman, indigenous
 Pauridia pusilla (Snijman) Snijman & Kocyan, indigenous
 Pauridia pygmaea Snyman & Kocyan, indigenous
 Pauridia scullyi (Baker) Snijman & Kocyan, indigenous
 Pauridia serrata (Baker) Snijman & Kocyan, indigenous
 Pauridia serrata (Thunb.) Snijman & Kocyan subsp. serrata, indigenous
 Pauridia serrata (Thunb.) Snijman & Kocyan var. albiflora (Nel) Snijman & Kocyan, indigenous
 Pauridia trifurcillata (Nel) Snijman & Kocyan, indigenous
 Pauridia umbraticola (Schltr.) Snijman & Kocyan, indigenous
 Pauridia verna (Hilliard & B.L.Burtt) Snijman & Kocyan, indigenous

Rhodohypoxis
Genus Rhodohypoxis:
 Rhodohypoxis baurii (Baker) Nel, indigenous
 Rhodohypoxis baurii (Baker) Nel var. baurii, indigenous
 Rhodohypoxis baurii (Baker) Nel var. confecta Hilliard & B.L.Burtt, indigenous
 Rhodohypoxis baurii (Baker) Nel var. platypetala (Baker) Nel, endemic
 Rhodohypoxis deflexa Hilliard & B.L.Burtt, indigenous
 Rhodohypoxis incompta Hilliard & B.L.Burtt, indigenous
 Rhodohypoxis milloides (Baker) Hilliard & B.L.Burtt, indigenous
 Rhodohypoxis rubella (Baker) Nel, indigenous
 Rhodohypoxis thodiana (Nel) Hilliard & B.L.Burtt, indigenous

Saniella
Genus Saniella:
 Saniella occidentalis (Nel) B.L.Burtt, accepted as Pauridia alticola Snijman & Kocyan, endemic
 Saniella verna Hilliard & B.L.Burtt, accepted as Pauridia verna (Hilliard & B.L.Burtt) Snijman & Kocyan, indigenous

Spiloxene
Genus Spiloxene is now included in Pauridia.
 Spiloxene acida (Nel) Garside = Pauridia acida (Nel) Snijman & Kocyan, endemic
 Spiloxene aemulans (Nel) Garside = Pauridia aemulans (Nel) Snijman & Kocyan
 Spiloxene alba (Thunb.) Fourc. = Pauridia alba (Thunb.) Snijman & Kocyan, endemic
 Spiloxene aquatica (L.f.) Salisb. ex Fourc. = Pauridia aquatica (L.f.) Snijman & Kocyan, endemic
 Spiloxene canaliculata Garside = Pauridia canaliculata (Garside) Snijman & Kocyan, endemic
 Spiloxene capensis (L.) Garside = Pauridia capensis (L.) Snijman & Kocyan, endemic
 Spiloxene curculigoides (Bolus) Garside = Pauridia curculigoides (Bolus) Snijman & Kocyan, endemic
 Spiloxene cuspidata (Nel) Garside = Pauridia ovata (L.f.) Snijman & Kocyan
 Spiloxene declinata (Nel) Garside = Pauridia curculigoides (Bolus) Snijman & Kocyan
 Spiloxene dielsiana (Nel) Garside = Pauridia serrata subsp. serrata, endemic
 Spiloxene flaccida (Nel) Garside = Pauridia flaccida (Nel) Snijman & Kocyan, endemic
 Spiloxene gracilipes (Schltr.) Garside = Pauridia ovata (L.f.) Snijman & Kocyan
 Spiloxene linearis (Andrews) Garside = Pauridia serrata (Thunb.) Snijman & Kocyan subsp. serrata
 Spiloxene maximiliani (Schltr.) Garside = Pauridia umbraticola (Schltr.) Snijman & Kocyan
 Spiloxene minuta (L.) Fourc. accepted as Pauridia pygmaea Snyman & Kocyan, endemic
 Spiloxene monophylla (Schltr. ex Baker) Garside = Pauridia monophylla (Schltr. ex Baker) Snijman & Kocyan, endemic
 Spiloxene namaquana U.Mull.-Doblies, Mark.Ackermann, Weigend & D.Mull.-Doblies = Pauridia serrata subsp. serrata
 Spiloxene nana Snijman = Pauridia nana (Snijman) Snijman & Kocyan
 Spiloxene ovata (L.f.) Garside = Pauridia ovata (L.f.) Snijman & Kocyan, endemic
 Spiloxene pusilla Snijman = Pauridia pusilla (Snijman) Snijman & Kocyan
 Spiloxene schlechteri (Bolus) Garside = Pauridia affinis (Schult. & Schult.f.) Snijman & Kocyan, endemic
 Spiloxene scullyi (Baker) Garside = Pauridia scullyi (Baker) Snijman & Kocyan indigenous
 Spiloxene serrata (Thunb.) Garside var. albiflora (Nel) Garside = Pauridia serrata (Thunb.) Snijman & Kocyan var. albiflora (Nel) Snijman & Kocyan, endemic
 Spiloxene serrata (Thunb.) Garside var. serrata = Pauridia serrata (Thunb.) Snijman & Kocyan subsp. serrata, endemic
 Spiloxene trifurcillata (Nel) Fourc. = Pauridia trifurcillata (Nel) Snijman & Kocyan, endemic
 Spiloxene umbraticola (Schltr.) Garside = Pauridia umbraticola (Schltr.) Snijman & Kocyan, endemic

Iridaceae

Family: Iridaceae, 65 genera have been recorded. Not all are necessarily currently accepted.

Genus Acidanthera:
Genus Afrosolen:
Genus Agretta:
Genus Anisanthus:
Genus Anomatheca:
Genus Antholyza:
Genus Aristea:
Genus Babiana:
Genus Barnardiella:
Genus Belamcanda:
Genus Bobartia:
Genus Chasmanthe:
Genus Codonorhiza:
Genus Crocosmia:
Genus Devia:
Genus Dierama:
Genus Dietes:
Genus Duthiastrum:
Genus Ferraria:
Genus Freesia:
Genus Galaxia:
Genus Geissorhiza:
Genus Gladiolus:
Genus Gynandriris:
Genus Hesperantha:
Genus Hexaglottis:
Genus Homeria:
Genus Homoglossum:
Genus Houttuynia:
Genus Hyalis:
Genus Iris:
Genus Ixia:
Genus Klattia:
Genus Lapeirousia:
Genus Melasphaerula:
Genus Meristostigma:
Genus Micranthus:
Genus Montbretia:
Genus Moraea:
Genus Morphixia:
Genus Nivenia:
Genus Nymanina:
Genus Ovieda:
Genus Peyrousia:
Genus Pillansia:
Genus Psilosiphon:
Genus Radinosiphon:
Genus Rheome:
Genus Roggeveldia:
Genus Romulea:
Genus Schizorhiza:
Genus Schizostylis:
Genus Sisyrinchium:
Genus Sophronia:
Genus Sparaxis:
Genus Syringodea:
Genus Thereianthus:
Genus Tritonia:
Genus Tritoniopsis:
Genus Tritonixia:
Genus Waitzia:
Genus Watsonia:
Genus Witsenia:
Genus Wuerthia:
Genus Xenoscapa:

Lanariaceae
Family: Lanariaceae,

Lanaria
Genus Lanaria:
 Lanaria lanata (L.) T.Durand & Schinz	, endemic

Orchidaceae

Family: Orchidaceae, 67 genera have been recorded. Not all are necessarily currently accepted.

Genus Acampe: 
Genus Acrolophia: 
Genus Aerangis:
Genus Aeranthus:
Genus Angraecum:
Genus Bartholina:
Genus Bolusiella:
Genus Bonatea:
Genus Brachycorythis:
Genus Brownleea:
Genus Bulbophyllum:
Genus Calanthe:
Genus Centrostigma:
Genus Ceratandra:
Genus Cirrhopetalum:
Genus Corycium:
Genus Corymborkis:
Genus Cymbidium:
Genus Cynorkis:
Genus Cyrtorchis:
Genus Diaphananthe:
Genus Didymoplexis: 
Genus Disa:
Genus Disperis:
Genus Dracomonticola:
Genus Eulophia:
Genus Evotella:
Genus Gastrodia:
Genus Habenaria:
Genus Herschelianthe:
Genus Holothrix:
Genus Huttonaea:
Genus Jumellea:
Genus Limodorum:
Genus Liparis:
Genus Margelliantha:
Genus Microcoelia:
Genus Monadenia:
Genus Mystacidium:
Genus Neobolusia:
Genus Nervilia:
Genus Oeceoclades:
Genus Orthochilus:
Genus Pachites:
Genus Platycoryne:
Genus Platylepis:
Genus Polystachya:
Genus Pterygodium:
Genus Rangaeris:
Genus Rhipidoglossum:
Genus Saccolabium:
Genus Satyridium:
Genus Satyrium:
Genus Schizochilus:
Genus Schizodium:
Genus Serapia:
Genus Serapias:
Genus Solenangis:
Genus Stenoglottis:
Genus Tridactyle:
Genus Vanilla:
Genus Ypsilopus:
Genus Zeuxine:

Ruscaceae
Family: Ruscaceae,

Dracaena
Genus Dracaena:
 Dracaena aletriformis (Haw.) Bos, indigenous
 Dracaena mannii Baker, indigenous
 Dracaena transvaalensis Baker, endemic

Eriospermum
Genus Eriospermum:
 Eriospermum abyssinicum Baker, accepted as Eriospermum flagelliforme (Baker) J.C.Manning
 Eriospermum aequilibre Poelln. endemic
 Eriospermum alcicorne Baker, endemic
 Eriospermum algiferum A.V.Duthie, endemic
 Eriospermum aphyllum Marloth, endemic
 Eriospermum appendiculatum A.V.Duthie, endemic
 Eriospermum arachnoideum P.L.Perry, endemic
 Eriospermum arenicolum Poelln. accepted as Eriospermum paradoxum (Jacq.) Ker Gawl.
 Eriospermum arenosum P.L.Perry, endemic
 Eriospermum aribesense P.L.Perry, endemic
 Eriospermum armianum P.L.Perry, endemic
 Eriospermum attenuatum P.L.Perry, endemic
 Eriospermum avasmontanum Dinter, accepted as Eriospermum schinzii Baker
 Eriospermum bakerianum Schinz, indigenous
 Eriospermum bakerianum Schinz subsp. bakerianum, indigenous
 Eriospermum bayeri P.L.Perry, endemic
 Eriospermum bifidum R.A.Dyer, endemic
 Eriospermum bowieanum Baker, endemic
 Eriospermum bracteatum Archibald, endemic
 Eriospermum brevipes Baker, endemic
 Eriospermum breviscapum P.L.Perry, endemic
 Eriospermum bruynsii P.L.Perry, endemic
 Eriospermum burchellii Baker, accepted as Eriospermum flagelliforme (Baker) J.C.Manning
 Eriospermum calcareum P.L.Perry, endemic
 Eriospermum capense (L.) Thunb. indigenous
 Eriospermum capense (L.) Thunb. subsp. capense, endemic
 Eriospermum capense (L.) Thunb. subsp. stoloniferum (Marloth) P.L.Perry, endemic
 Eriospermum cernuum Baker, endemic
 Eriospermum cervicorne Marloth, endemic
 Eriospermum ciliatum P.L.Perry, endemic
 Eriospermum coactum P.L.Perry, endemic
 Eriospermum coerulescens Poelln. accepted as Eriospermum ornithogaloides Baker
 Eriospermum confertum Baker, accepted as Eriospermum spirale Schult.
 Eriospermum confusum Poelln. accepted as Eriospermum corymbosum Baker
 Eriospermum cooperi Baker, indigenous
 Eriospermum cooperi Baker var. cooperi, indigenous
 Eriospermum cooperi Baker var. natalense (Baker) P.L.Perry, indigenous
 Eriospermum cordiforme Salter, endemic
 Eriospermum corymbosum Baker, indigenous
 Eriospermum crispum P.L.Perry, endemic
 Eriospermum descendens P.L.Perry, endemic
 Eriospermum deserticolum Marloth ex P.L.Perry, endemic
 Eriospermum dielsianum Poelln. indigenous
 Eriospermum dielsianum Poelln. subsp. dielsianum, endemic
 Eriospermum dielsianum Poelln. subsp. molle P.L.Perry, endemic
 Eriospermum dissitiflorum Schltr. endemic
 Eriospermum dregei Schonland, endemic
 Eriospermum duthieae Salter, accepted as Eriospermum cernuum Baker
 Eriospermum dyeri Archibald, endemic
 Eriospermum erinum P.L.Perry, endemic
 Eriospermum eriophorum P.L.Perry, endemic
 Eriospermum ernstii P.L.Perry, endemic
 Eriospermum exigium P.L.Perry, endemic
 Eriospermum exile P.L.Perry, endemic
 Eriospermum filicaule P.L.Perry, endemic
 Eriospermum flabellatum P.L.Perry, endemic
 Eriospermum flagelliforme (Baker) J.C.Manning, indigenous
 Eriospermum flavum P.L.Perry, endemic
 Eriospermum folioliferum Andrews, endemic
 Eriospermum fragile P.L.Perry, endemic
 Eriospermum galpinii Schinz, accepted as Eriospermum mackenii (Hook.f.) Baker subsp. galpinii (Schinz) P.L.Perry
 Eriospermum glaciale P.L.Perry, endemic
 Eriospermum graminifolium A.V.Duthie, endemic
 Eriospermum haygarthii Baker, accepted as Eriospermum ornithogaloides Baker
 Eriospermum herporrhizum Salter, accepted as Eriospermum nanum Marloth
 Eriospermum hygrophilum Baker, accepted as Eriospermum cooperi Baker var. cooperi
 Eriospermum inconspicuum P.L.Perry, endemic
 Eriospermum lanceifolium Jacq. endemic
 Eriospermum lanceifolium Jacq. var. orthophyllum Archibald, accepted as Eriospermum orthophyllum (Archibald) P.L.Perry
 Eriospermum lanimarginatum P.L.Perry, endemic
 Eriospermum lanuginosum Jacq. endemic
 Eriospermum laxiracemosum P.L.Perry, endemic
 Eriospermum luteorubrum Baker, accepted as Eriospermum flagelliforme (Baker) J.C.Manning
 Eriospermum macgregoriorum P.L.Perry, endemic
 Eriospermum mackenii (Hook.f.) Baker, indigenous
 Eriospermum mackenii (Hook.f.) Baker subsp. galpinii (Schinz) P.L.Perry, indigenous
 Eriospermum mackenii (Hook.f.) Baker subsp. mackenii, indigenous
 Eriospermum macrum Poelln. accepted as Eriospermum cernuum Baker
 Eriospermum marginatum P.L.Perry, endemic
 Eriospermum minutiflorum P.L.Perry, endemic
 Eriospermum minutipustulatum P.L.Perry, endemic
 Eriospermum multifidum Marloth, endemic
 Eriospermum namaquanum P.L.Perry, endemic
 Eriospermum nanum Marloth, endemic
 Eriospermum natalense Baker, accepted as Eriospermum cooperi Baker var. natalense (Baker) P.L.Perry
 Eriospermum occultum Archibald, endemic
 Eriospermum omahekense Engl. & K.Krause, accepted as Eriospermum mackenii (Hook.f.) Baker subsp. galpinii (Schinz) P.L.Perry
 Eriospermum ornithogaloides Baker, indigenous
 Eriospermum orthophyllum (Archibald) P.L.Perry, endemic
 Eriospermum papilliferum A.V.Duthie, endemic
 Eriospermum paradoxum (Jacq.) Ker Gawl. endemic
 Eriospermum parvifolium Jacq. endemic
 Eriospermum parvulum P.L.Perry, endemic
 Eriospermum patentiflorum Schltr. endemic
 Eriospermum platyphyllum Baker, accepted as Eriospermum cooperi Baker var. natalense (Baker) P.L.Perry
 Eriospermum porphyrium Archibald, indigenous
 Eriospermum porphyrovalve Baker, indigenous
 Eriospermum proliferum Baker, endemic
 Eriospermum pubescens Jacq. endemic
 Eriospermum pumilum Salter, endemic
 Eriospermum pusillum P.L.Perry, endemic
 Eriospermum pustulatum A.V.Duthie, endemic
 Eriospermum ramosum P.L.Perry, endemic
 Eriospermum ratelpoortianum P.L.Perry, endemic
 Eriospermum reflexum Schinz, accepted as Eriospermum mackenii (Hook.f.) Baker subsp. galpinii (Schinz) P.L.Perry
 Eriospermum rhizomatum P.L.Perry, endemic
 Eriospermum roseum Schinz, indigenous
 Eriospermum sabulosum P.L.Perry, endemic
 Eriospermum schinzii Baker, indigenous
 Eriospermum schlechteri Baker, endemic
 Eriospermum spirale Schult. endemic
 Eriospermum stoloniferum Marloth, accepted as Eriospermum capense (L.) Thunb. subsp. stoloniferum (Marloth) P.L.Perry
 Eriospermum subincanum P.L.Perry, endemic
 Eriospermum subtile P.L.Perry, endemic
 Eriospermum tenellum Baker, accepted as Eriospermum porphyrovalve Baker
 Eriospermum thyrsoideum Baker, accepted as Eriospermum capense (L.) Thunb. subsp. capense
 Eriospermum titanopsoides P.L.Perry, endemic
 Eriospermum tortuosum Dammer, accepted as Eriospermum bakerianum Schinz subsp. tortuosum (Dammer) P.L.Perry
 Eriospermum tuberculatum P.L.Perry, endemic
 Eriospermum undulatum P.L.Perry, endemic
 Eriospermum vermiforme P.L.Perry, endemic
 Eriospermum villosum Baker, endemic
 Eriospermum viscosum P.L.Perry, endemic
 Eriospermum zeyheri R.A.Dyer, endemic

Sansevieria
Genus Sansevieria:
 Sansevieria aethiopica Thunb. indigenous
 Sansevieria concinna N.E.Br. indigenous
 Sansevieria hallii Chahin. indigenous
 Sansevieria hyacinthoides (L.) Druce, indigenous
 Sansevieria metallica Gerome & Labroy, indigenous
 Sansevieria pearsonii N.E.Br. indigenous

Tecophilaeaceae
Family: Tecophilaeaceae,

Cyanella
Genus Cyanella:
 Cyanella alba L.f. indigenous
 Cyanella alba L.f. subsp. alba, endemic
 Cyanella alba L.f. subsp. flavescens J.C.Manning, indigenous
 Cyanella alba L.f. subsp. minor J.C.Manning, indigenous
 Cyanella aquatica Oberm. ex G.Scott, endemic
 Cyanella cygnea G.Scott, endemic
 Cyanella hyacinthoides Royen ex L. endemic
 Cyanella lineata Burch. accepted as Cyanella lutea L.f. subsp. rosea (Eckl. ex Baker) J.C.Manning & Goldblatt
 Cyanella lutea L.f. indigenous
 Cyanella lutea L.f. forma angustior Zahlbr. accepted as Cyanella lutea L.f. subsp. lutea
 Cyanella lutea L.f. var. rosea Eckl. ex Baker, accepted as Cyanella lutea L.f. subsp. rosea (Eckl. ex Baker) J.C.Manning & Goldblatt
 Cyanella marlothii J.C.Manning & Goldblatt, indigenous
 Cyanella odoratissima Ker Gawl. accepted as Cyanella lutea L.f. subsp. rosea (Eckl. ex Baker) J.C.Manning & Goldblatt
 Cyanella orchidiformis Jacq. endemic
 Cyanella pentheri Zahlbr. accepted as Cyanella hyacinthoides Royen ex L.
 Cyanella racemosa Schinz, accepted as Cyanella lutea L.f. subsp. lutea
 Cyanella ramosissima (Engl. & K.Krause) Engl. & K.Krause, indigenous

Walleria
Genus Walleria:
 Walleria armata Schltr. & K.Krause, accepted as Walleria gracilis (Salisb.) S.Carter
 Walleria gracilis (Salisb.) S.Carter, indigenous
 Walleria nutans J.Kirk, indigenous

References

South African plant biodiversity lists
Asparagales